Marina Kuzhmar (born 3 January 1977 in Minsk, Belarus) is a Belarusian rower. She competed in the women's eight at the 2000 Summer Olympics.

References

Living people
Belarusian female rowers
Olympic rowers of Belarus
Rowers at the 2000 Summer Olympics
1977 births